Lafuente, Spanish for "the fountain", may refer to:

People
Lafuente (footballer, 1907-1973), Spanish footballer
Abelardo Lafuente García-Rojo (1871-1931), Spanish architect and entrepreneur
Ander Lafuente (born 1983), Spanish football midfielder
Andoni Lafuente (born 1865), Spanish cyclist
David Lafuente (born 1982), Spanish comic book artist
Iñaki Lafuente (born 1976), Spanish football goalkeeper
Senel (born 1984), full name José Manuel Lafuente Garrido, Spanish football forward
Marta Lafuente (born 1968), Paraguayan psychologist and politician
Sonia Lafuente (born 1991), Spanish figure skater

Places
Lafuente, Cantabria, locality in the municipality of Lamasón, Spain

See also
Fuente (disambiguation)
De La Fuente (disambiguation)